Ūdrija is a village in Alytus district municipality, in Alytus County, in south Lithuania. According to the 2001 census, the village has a population of 453 people.

Education 
Ūdrija primary school

References

Alytus District Municipality
Villages in Alytus County